Sir Sri Rama Varma XVI  (1858 – 21 March 1932) was the ruler of the Kingdom of Cochin from 1915 to 1932.

Reign 
Rama Varma XVI succeeded Rama Varma XV on his abdication in 1914. Rama Varma ruled from 25 January 1915 until his death on  21 March 1932.

Legacy

He is remembered as the king who had given the Thitooram (Royal white) to build a new church within the premises of the fort city of Thrissur. Basilica of Our Lady of Dolours known as the largest church in India, stand tall in Thrissur, showing the love of the king to Christians.

Death 
Rama Varma died on 21 March 1932 in Madras. He was aged 74. As he died at Madras, he is known as 'Madrasil Theepetta Thamburan'. His death came two months after the death of his predecessor.

References 

 

1932 deaths
1858 births
Rulers of Cochin